Anastraphia is a genus of flowering plants in the family Asteraceae. It is native to the West Indies.

Several species formerly in Anastraphia have been transferred to the related genus Gochnatia.

 Species

References

Asteraceae genera
Flora of the Caribbean
Gochnatioideae